Philip Joseph Martinovich (February 9, 1915 – September 22, 1964) was an American football player who played two seasons in the National Football League with the Detroit Lions and Chicago Bears. He played college football at the University of the Pacific and attended El Dorado High School in Placerville, California. He was also a member of the Brooklyn Dodgers of the All-America Football Conference.

References

External links
Just Sports Stats

1915 births
1964 deaths
Players of American football from California
Sportspeople from Greater Sacramento
American football fullbacks
American football guards
Pacific Tigers football players
Detroit Lions players
Chicago Bears players
Brooklyn Dodgers (AAFC) players
People from El Dorado County, California